Robin Moulder (born April 2, 1966) is an American musician, best known as being one of the founders of the riot goth-girl group Jack Off Jill and her subsequent project, TCR. She is a bassist, pianist, and programmer.

History 
Robin Moulder grew up with one sister Helen Moulder and two brothers Dave and Al Moulder. Moulder began studying music on trumpet and piano and initially didn't envision a musical career for herself. She received a Bachelor of Science in Engineering. Her first job out of college took her to Florida. She began playing keyboard for a live band, and moved to bass to fill the void left by a departing bandmate. She quickly discovered an aptitude for the instrument, and began looking for other people who shared her outlook on music. She found them in Tenni Ah-Cha-Cha, Jessicka Addams, and Michelle Inhell, and the four of them created Jack Off Jill.

Jack Off Jill 
Moulder was with Jack Off Jill from its inception to its demise, having written or co-written most of the music for the band over its lifetime. She and Jessicka were the only two permanent members, watching over a revolving door of musicians throughout the band's history, including Scott Putesky, aka Daisy Berkowitz, the original guitarist from Marilyn Manson, and Chris Vrenna of Tweaker, formerly of Nine Inch Nails. Fodera and Moulder finally called it quits in 2000, with Moulder not involved in the 2015 reunion of Jack Off Jill, possibly over some feud between the two musicians which remains unclear.

TCR 
After the breakup Moulder struck up a friendship with TC, formerly of the band Triggerpimp, and the two women agreed to collaborate on a project together, which would later be called TCR. When Moulder moved to Detroit to serve as the Chief Technology Officer for a startup company, she and TC stayed in contact and began crafting their release via phone, FedEx, and FTP along with guest musicians such as Chris Vrenna, Scott Putesky, and method from Godhead. Released in 2004, The Chrome Recordings was called the "best goth/industrial/whatever releases of the year" by some reviewers.

TCR's music is self described as "A fusion of from metal, industrial, rock, and goth, with a dose of punk aggression". The Chrome Recordings was their only album.

Personal life 
Moulder is married to game designer Colin McComb. They have two children. He moved to Detroit with her after she got offered a job, shortly after they met. Together with her husband, they have created 3lbGames, a company specialized in game design and development.

Discography

With Jack Off Jill

Albums/CDs 
 Children 5 and Up (1993)
 The Boygrinder Sessions (1994)
 Cannibal Song Book (1995)
 Cockroach Waltz (1996)
 Sexless Demons and Scars (1997)
 Clear Hearts Grey Flowers (2000)

Singles and EPs 
 My Cat/Swollen (1993 and 1994)
 Girlscout/ American Made ( 7" Risk Records 1996)
 Covetous Creature (1998)

With TCR 
 The Chrome Recordings (2004)

Notes

External links 
Jack Off Jill

Living people
American industrial musicians
American rock bass guitarists
American heavy metal bass guitarists
American women guitarists
Women bass guitarists
Guitarists from New Jersey
Guitarists from Florida
1966 births
20th-century American bass guitarists
20th-century American women musicians
Jack Off Jill members
21st-century American women